Rhaponticum carthamoides, also known as Maral root or Rhaponticum, is an herbaceous perennial plant from the family Asteraceae that inhabits the sub-alpine zone ( above sea level) as well as alpine meadows. It can be found growing wild in Southern Siberia, Kazakhstan, the Altay region, and Western Sayan Mountains. Maral root is widely cultivated throughout Russia and Eastern Europe.  This plant derives its traditional name Maral root (Maralu) from the maral deer who fed on it. 

R. carthamoides is high in 20-hydroxyecdysone, one of the most common molting hormones in insects, crabs, and some worms and can disrupt their molting and reproduction.

References

Cynareae
Medicinal plants